Weird Fantasy is an American dark fantasy and science fiction anthology comic that was part of the EC Comics line in the early 1950s. The companion comic for Weird Fantasy was Weird Science. Over a four-year span, Weird Fantasy ran for 22 issues, ending with the November–December 1953 issue.

Publication history
The bi-monthly science-fiction comic, published by Bill Gaines and edited by Al Feldstein, replaced romance comic A Moon, A Girl... Romance with the May/June 1950 issue. Although the title and format change took effect with issue 13, Gaines and Feldstein decided not to restart the numbering in order to save money on second class postage. The Post Office took note, and starting with issue #6, all the issues were numbered correctly. Because of this, "Weird Fantasy #13" could refer to either the May/June 1950 issue or the actual 13th issue of the title, published in 1952. The same confusion exists for issues #14–17, #17 being the last issue published before EC reset the numbering.

Artist/writer Harry Harrison claims credit for originally turning Gaines on to the idea of publishing science fiction. Harrison has stated that he and fellow artist Wally Wood were interested in science fiction and supplied Gaines with a lot of science fiction material to read. Harrison had no editorial control over the contents of the comic aside from his own stories, and he left EC by the end of 1950.

Artists and writers
Cover illustrations were by Feldstein with the exception of two by Joe Orlando, one collaboration by Feldstein and Al Williamson, plus another collaboration by Williamson with Frank Frazetta. Artists who drew stories for this EC title were Feldstein, Frazetta, Williamson, Orlando, Wally Wood, Harvey Kurtzman, George Roussos, Harrison, Reed Crandall, Will Elder, Bernard Krigstein, Jack Kamen, John Severin and Mac Elkin. Writers in the early issues included Feldstein, Gaines, Kurtzman, Harrison and Gardner Fox. Gaines and Feldstein wrote nearly all stories from 1951–53.

Stories and themes
Creators Gaines and Feldstein made cameos in the stories "Cosmic Ray Bomb Explosion" (14, July–August 1950), "7 Year Old Genius" (7) and "The Expert" (14) and "The Ad" (14).

Issues 14 and 15 in 1952 ran EC Quickies, a format featuring two similarly themed stories, each three or four pages, in the space usually devoted to a seven or eight-page story.

In Weird Fantasy 17 (1953), Al Williamson illustrated "The Aliens". Three aliens head for Earth to prevent a nuclear war, but they arrive too late. Amid the devastation they find a copy of Weird Fantasy 17. When they read "The Aliens", they see that it had predicted their arrival. On the last page they see a picture of themselves looking at a comic book with a picture of themselves looking at... ad infinitum.

Quite possibly the comic's most controversial story was published in issue 18 in 1953. "Judgment Day" featured an astronaut who comes to a planet populated by orange and blue robots who hope to join the Galactic Republic. As he tours the planet, the astronaut, named Tarlton, realizes that blue robots are treated horribly and given fewer rights than the orange robots, despite the fact that they are identical except for the color of their exterior. Tarlton decides that because of this, the planet will not be allowed in the Galactic Republic. In the final panel Tarlton removes his helmet, revealing that he is black. This story was chosen for reprinting approximately three years later in Incredible Science Fiction, which resulted in an argument that caused Gaines to quit comics altogether.

Influences and adaptations
As with the other EC comics edited by Feldstein, the stories in this comic were primarily based on Gaines reading a large number of science fiction stories and using them to develop "springboards" from which he and Feldstein could launch new stories. Specific story influences that have been identified include the following:

"Martian Infiltration" (issue 15 [1950]) – Martin Pearson's "The Embassy"
"The Last City" (issue 16 [1950]) – Arthur L. Zagat's "The Lanson Screen"
"Deadlock!" (issue 17 [1950]) – Murray Leinster's "First Contact"
"The Duplicates" (issue 9) – William F. Temple's "4-Sided Triangle"
"A Timely Shock" (issue 10) – Fritz Leiber's "Nice Girl With Five Husbands"
"The Thing in the Jar" (issue 11) – Ralph Milne Farley's "Liquid Life"
"A Lesson in Anatomy" (issue 12) – Ray Bradbury's "The Man Upstairs"
"The End" (issue 13) – Damon Knight's "Not With A Bang" and Miriam Allen deFord's "The Last Generation"
"Home to Stay" (issue 13) – Ray Bradbury's "The Rocket Man" and "Kaleidoscope"
"The Long Trip" (issue 15) – A. E. van Vogt's "Far Centaurus"
"He Who Waits" (issue 15) – Manly Wade Wellman's "The Kelpie"
"Mass Meeting" (issue 16) – Malcolm Jameson's "Tricky Tonnage"
"The Green Thing" (issue 16) – John Campbell's "Who Goes There?"
"...For Us the Living" (issue 20) – Ward Moore's "Bring the Jubilee"

After their publication of "Home to Stay", Ray Bradbury contacted EC about their plagiarism of his work. They reached an agreement for EC to do authorized versions of Bradbury's short fiction.  These official adaptations include:

"There Will Come Soft Rains" (issue 17)
"Zero Hour" (issue 18)
"King of the Grey Spaces" (issue 19)
"I, Rocket" (issue 20)
"The Million Year Picnic" (issue 21)
"The Silent Towns" (issue 22)

Demise
EC's science fiction comics were never able to match the popularity of their horror comics like Tales from the Crypt, but Gaines and Feldstein kept them alive using the profits from their more popular titles. In the EC Library reprints, comics historian Mark Evanier theorizes that the short story format, where no story was longer than eight pages helped contribute to poor sales because the horror comics were much better suited for very short stories with shock endings than the science fiction comics. Evanier also ponders whether the very similar logo style of Weird Science and its companion comic Weird Fantasy, as well as similar cover subjects contributed to lower sales due to customers thinking they already owned the issues on sale. Historian Digby Diehl wondered whether having host characters like EC's horror comics would have helped the comics be more commercially successful.

When the poor sales became too much to handle, Weird Fantasy combined with companion comic Weird Science in 1954 to become Weird Science-Fantasy. As discussed in an "In Memoriam" feature in the final issue, every issue for the previous year and a half had lost money, and EC had no choice but to combine the two comics into one. Weird Science-Fantasy ran for seven issues before a title change to Incredible Science Fiction for four issues.

Reprints
As with many other EC titles, Weird Fantasy has been reprinted numerous times over the years. Ballantine Books reprinted selected stories in a series of paperback EC anthologies in 1964–66. All 22 issues were published in black and white in four hardbound volumes in 1980 as part of publisher Russ Cochran's The Complete EC Library. In addition, all 22 issues were reprinted in comic form in the mid-1990s by Cochran and Gemstone Publishing. This complete run was later rebound, with covers included, in a series of five softcover EC Annuals. Cochran and Gemstone planned to publish hardcover, re-colored volumes of Weird Fantasy as part of the EC Archives series, but Gemstone's financial troubles left this project in limbo. 

GC Press LLC, a boutique imprint established by Russ Cochran and Grant Geissman, announced in a press release dated September 1, 2011 that it is continuing the EC Archives series, with the first new releases scheduled for November 2011. Dark Horse Comics is reprinting EC comics in high quality full color hardbacks.  As of April 2019 there have been two books reprinting the first 12 issues of Weird Fantasy.

Issue guide

Notes

References

External links
CBW Comic History
Horror from the Crypt of Fear 9: "OTR: The Evil Influence Behind EC" by Kurt Kuersteiner
Weird Fantasy news

Comics magazines published in the United States
1950 comics debuts
1953 comics endings
Comics by Gardner Fox
Defunct American comics
Horror comics
Fantasy comics
Science fiction comics
1950 establishments in the United States
1953 disestablishments in the United States
Magazines established in 1950
Magazines disestablished in 1953